Michael Lane (born 1942) is an Irish retired hurler who played as a right corner-back for the Cork senior team.

Born in Blackpool, Lane first arrived on the inter-county scene at the age of seventeen when he first linked up with the Cork minor team. He joined the senior panel during the 1966 championship. Lane went on to enjoy a brief career with Cork, and won one All-Ireland medal and one Munster medal as a non-playing substitute.

At club level Lane is a one-time Munster medallist with Glen Rovers. In addition to this he also won several championship medals.

Honours

Player

Glen Rovers
Munster Senior Club Hurling Championship (1): 1964

Cork
All-Ireland Senior Hurling Championship (1): 1966 (sub)
Munster Senior Hurling Championship (1): 1966 (sub)

References

1942 births
Living people
Glen Rovers hurlers
Cork inter-county hurlers